The men's 100 metre backstroke competition of the swimming events at the 1991 Pan American Games took place on 17 August. The last Pan American Games champion was Andrew Gill of US.

This race consisted of two lengths of the pool, all in backstroke.

Results
All times are in minutes and seconds.

Heats

Final 
The final was held on August 17.

References

Swimming at the 1991 Pan American Games